Saint Zoe may refer to:

Zoe of Rome (d. ca. 286), noblewoman, wife of Nicostratus, a high Roman court official. Later saint 
Zoe (died 127 AD), wife of Exuperius, 2nd century Christian martyr alongside Exuperius (see Exuperius and Zoe)